The Record-Courier is a twice-a-week newspaper in Gardnerville, Nevada. It has its origins in The Carson Valley News founded in Genoa, Nevada, in 1875 by A. C. Pratt. The newspaper was renamed The Genoa Courier in 1880 and merged that year with The Genoa Journal. It merged with The Gardnerville Record in 1904 to form The Record-Courier. It is one of the oldest continuously published nameplates in Nevada. It was purchased by Swift Communications in 1988. The Record-Courier covers Carson Valley, located in Douglas County, Alpine County (California), and Mono County (California) in the eastern Sierra Nevada. An original woodcut of the Carson Range as it rises above Carson Valley produced by syndicated cartoonist Lew Hymers in 1928 appears in the banner. On August 1, 2019, The Record-Courier along with the Nevada Appeal, the Lahontan Valley News, and the Northern Nevada Business View were sold to Pacific Publishing. The papers reformed under the Nevada News Group.

References

External links
 Record-Courier site

Newspapers published in Nevada
Newspapers established in 1875